Bhongir Assembly constituency is a constituency of the Telangana Legislative Assembly, India. It is one among 12 constituencies in the Yadadri Bhuvanagiri district. It is part of Bhongir Lok Sabha constituency.

Pailla Shekar Reddy of Telangana Rashtra Samithi won the seat for the first time in 2014 Assembly election and for a second time in 2019 Assembly election.

Mandals
The Assembly Constituency presently comprises the following Mandals:

Members of Legislative Assembly

Election results

Telangana Legislative Assembly election, 2018

Telangana Legislative Assembly election, 2014

See also
 Bhongir
 List of constituencies of Telangana Legislative Assembly

References

Assembly constituencies of Telangana
Assembly constituencies of Nalgonda district